Z-car is the Nissan Z-car, a series of sports cars.

Z-car/Z-Cars, zed-car or zee-cars may also refer to:

Automobiles
 Ford Zephyr, an executive car by Ford of Britain from 1950 to 1972
 BMW Z, a line of roadsters
 BMW Z1, a two-seat roadster
 BMW Z3, the first modern mass-market roadster produced by BMW
 BMW Z4, a rear-wheel drive sports car
 BMW Z4 (E85)
 BMW Z4 (E89)
 BMW Z4 (G29)
 BMW Z8, limited edition high-performance rear wheel drive sports car
 Mitsubishi Z platform, a series of small cars on a shared platform built by Mitsubishi Motors and DaimlerChrysler
 Lincoln Z, a Chinese mid-size luxury sedan produced since 2022 onwards by Changan Ford

Police cars
 Z-Car, specific models of mid-20th century or generally police vehicles in the United Kingdom
 Z-Cars, a British 1960s and 1970s television police drama series

Military vehicles
 Z (military symbol), a nickname for russian military vehicles hence the z-logo used in the Russo-Ukrainian war.

See also

 Panda car, a small or medium sized marked British police car
 Honda Z, a two-door hatchback car by Honda from 1970 until 1974